Toms River is a township in Ocean County, in the U.S. state of New Jersey. Its mainland portion is also a census-designated place of the same name, which serves as the county seat of Ocean County. Formerly known as the Township of Dover, in 2006 voters approved a change of the official name to the Township of Toms River, adopting the name of the largest unincorporated community within the township. Located at the heart of the Jersey Shore region, the township is a bedroom suburb of New York City in the New York metropolitan area and a regional commercial hub in central New Jersey.

As of the 2020 United States census, the township was the state's eighth-most-populous municipality, with a population of 95,438, an increase of 4,199 (+4.6%) from the 2010 census count of 91,239, which in turn reflected an increase of 1,533 (+1.7%) from the 89,706 counted in the 2000 census.

Toms River is featured in various TV and news media, including MTV's Made and Jersey Shore (seasons 1, 3, and 5), HBO's Boardwalk Empire and the original The Amityville Horror movie. In 1998, Toms River East Little League won the Little League World Series. The township has what is said to be the second-largest Halloween parade in the world.

In 2006, Toms River was ranked by Morgan Quitno Press as the 15th safest city in the United States, of 369 cities nationwide. In 2007, Toms River was again ranked as the 14th-safest city in the United States of 371 cities nationwide.

History

Founding and early history
Much of the early history of the settlement of Toms River is obscured by conflicting stories. Various sources list the eponym of the township as either English captain William Tom, or farmer and ferryman Thomas Luker. In 1992, as part of celebrations commemorating the township's 225th anniversary, official recognition was granted to the tradition that the "Tom" in "Toms River" was for Thomas Luker, who ran a ferry across Goose Creek (now the Toms River). During the 19th century, Toms River became a center for shipbuilding, whaling, fishing, and iron and lumber production. The settlement and the river were usually spelled "Tom's River" in its early days, though its current spelling has been standard since the middle of the 19th century.

Toms River was located in the southern section of the Township of Shrewsbury that obtained a royal charter to secede in 1767 and form Dover Township.  During the American Revolutionary War, Toms River was home to a strategically important salt works that supplied colonial militias, as well as a base for privateer vessels that plundered British and Tory ships off the coast.  In March 1782, a group of British and loyalist soldiers attacked a blockhouse along the river that housed the colonial militia and captured Captain Joshua Huddy, who was later hanged at Sandy Hook.  Also destroyed were the salt works and most of the houses in the village. The incident greatly complicated the tense relationship between the British, loyalist, and colonial and was a factor in prolonging the peace negotiations that were then in progress in Paris until 1783.

The village of Toms River is listed on both the national and state registers of historic places.

Dover Township was incorporated as one of New Jersey's first 104 townships by the Township Act of 1798 of the New Jersey Legislature on February 21, 1798. Portions of the township were taken to form Jackson Township (March 6, 1844), Union Township (March 10, 1846, now Barnegat Township), Brick Township (February 15, 1850), Manchester Township (April 6, 1865), Berkeley Township (March 31, 1875), Island Heights (May 6, 1887), Lavallette (December 21, 1887) and Seaside Heights (February 26, 1913). The township's original name was for Dover, England, and was changed to Toms River Township based on a referendum passed in 2006.

Mid-19th and 20th centuries

In 1850, Toms River became the county seat of the newly created Ocean County when it was formed out of southern Monmouth County. During the second half of the 19th century and the early decades of the 20th, many new towns were carved out of Dover Township, including Brick, Jackson, Lakewood and Berkeley. The Village of Toms River attempted twice—in 1914 and 1926—to secede from Dover Township, but residents were unsuccessful. The part of Toms River on the south side of the river stretching down to Berkeley Township incorporated as South Toms River in 1927, but the core of the original village on the north side remains part of the wider township to this day.

Mid and late 20th century
In the last two decades of the twentieth century, the demographics of the township changed substantially, adding over 20,000 residents just in the 1990s alone. While the village is still the center of municipal and county government, the population in the area exploded in the decades after World War II, due in part to the completion of the Garden State Parkway. Whereas the village was the largest and most densely populated section of the township for over two centuries, the vast majority of residents now shop and work in other sections of the town.

Toms River made national headlines in the 1990s with their Little League Baseball team, nicknamed "Beast from the East", which competed in the Little League World Series three times in five years, winning in 1998 when they defeated Japan by a score of 12–9. More than 40,000 people lined Route 37 for a parade following their victory over Kashima, Japan. Toms River Little League made it to Williamsport in 2010 giving Toms River its record fourth Mid-Atlantic championship, returning there as regional runners up in 2021.

Toms River is also home to many National Champion Pop Warner Football and Cheerleading titles. 1996 Toms River Raider Jr. PeeWee Football team won a National Championship. Cheerleaders from the Toms River Little Indians, Toms River Raiders, and the Toms River Angels (formerly the Saint Joe's Angels) have won many National Titles. The first National Championship title was won in 1993 by the Toms River Little Indian Midget Cheer squad. In 2001, 2002, and 2003 the Toms River Angels brought home national titles resulting in the nations second ever three peat (meaning they brought home three national titles on the same level). In 2005, The Toms River Little Indians brought home two more national titles, and the Toms River Raiders won one. In 2006, The Toms River Angels Midget Large Advanced Cheer Squad and the Toms River Little Indians Midget Small Intermediate Cheer Squad won two more National Titles.  In 2007 The Toms River Angels brought home one and the Indians brought back two more to add to their history.

Superfund site 
In the mid-1990s, state and federal health and environmental agencies identified an increased incidence of childhood cancers in Toms River from the 1970–1995 period.  Multiple investigations by state and federal environmental and health agencies indicated that the likely source of the increased cancer risk was contamination from Toms River Chemical Plant (then operated by Ciba-Geigy), which had been in operation since 1952.  The area was designated a United States Environmental Protection Agency Superfund site in 1983 after an underground plume of toxic chemicals was identified.  The following year, a discharge pipe was shut down after a sinkhole at the corner of Bay Avenue and Vaughn Avenue revealed that it had been leaking.  The plant ceased operation in 1996. A follow up study from the 1996–2000 period indicated that while there were more cancer cases than expected, rates had significantly fallen and the difference was statistically insignificant compared to normal statewide cancer rates. Since 1996, the Toms River water system has been subject to the most stringent water testing in the state and is considered safe for consumption. Dan Fagin's Toms River: A Story of Science and Salvation, the 2014 Pulitzer Prize winning book, examined the issue of industrial pollution in detail.

Toms River Township
"Toms River" at one time referred only to the rural farming community of Toms River, a small part of the vast Township of Dover that included several other distinct settlements. With the United States Postal Service's adoption of Toms River mailing addresses for Dover Township, coupled with demographic changes in the other sections, those inside and outside began referring to all of mainland Dover Township as Toms River. In the 1990 Census, the census-designated place called "Toms River" only included the downtown village area that included fewer than 8,000 residents in 1990.  Due to complaints of confusion, the CDP was broadened to include all of mainland Dover Township to better reflect the more common usage for the area.

Over the years, confusion over the name of the township had become an issue for many residents.  A movement organized around the Dover Township Name Change Committee, founded by Mayor Paul Brush and supported by the Ocean County Chamber of Commerce, collected signatures to put a name change question on the ballot in November 2006. On Election Day, November 7, 2006, over 60% of residents voted to approve changing the name from the Township of Dover to the Township of Toms River. The name change campaign featured the slogan "Toms River YES", signifying a yes vote for the name change, and the name was officially changed on November 14, 2006.

Geography
According to the United States Census Bureau, the township had a total area of 52.89 square miles (136.98 km2), including 40.55 square miles (105.03 km2) of land and 12.34 square miles (31.95 km2) of water (23.32%).

While most of Toms River is on the mainland, Dover Beaches North and South are situated on the Barnegat Peninsula, a long, narrow barrier peninsula that separates Barnegat Bay from the Atlantic Ocean. Dover Beaches South adjoins the independent municipalities of Lavallette to the north and Seaside Heights to the south.

Dover Beaches North (2010 Census population of 1,239), Dover Beaches South (1,209) and Toms River CDP (88,791) are census-designated places and unincorporated communities located within Toms River Township. Other unincorporated communities, localities and place names located partially or completely within the township include Andrew Point, Andrews, Bay Shore, Cattus Island, Cedar Grove, Chadwick, Coates Point, East Dover, Gilford Park, Gilmores Island, Green Island, Long Point, Normandy Beach, Ocean Beach, Ortley Beach, Pelican Island, Pine View, Pleasant Plains, Shelter Cove, Silverton, Tilton Point, West Dover and White Oak Bottom.

Toms River includes the ZIP Codes 08753, 08754, 08755, 08756, 08757 and 08739. Ortley Beach (Dover Beaches South) shares ZIP Code 08751 with Seaside Heights.  Manchester Township does not have its own Post Office, and parts of Manchester use a Toms River mailing address under ZIP Code 08757.

Toms River Township borders the Ocean County municipalities of Berkeley Township, Brick Township, Island Heights, Jackson Township, Lakewood Township, Lavallette, Manchester Township, Seaside Heights and South Toms River.

The township is one of 11 municipalities in Ocean County that are part of the Toms River watershed.

Climate
Toms River has a humid subtropical climate, with significant rainfall throughout the year. The Köppen climate classification of the area is Cfa.

The township was severely affected by Superstorm Sandy in October 2012. Many low-lying areas of the township, including Silverton and the downtown area, saw their worst flooding ever when the storm surge overwhelmed the Barnegat Bay up and down the Jersey Shore. The barrier islands, just across the bridge, suffered even worse devastation from the storm surge brought by the hurricane. Extremes range from a record high of 105 °F on both July 19, 1999, and August 9, 1896, to a low of −24 °F on January 16, 1988.

Demographics

2010 census

The Census Bureau's 2006–2010 American Community Survey showed that (in 2010 inflation-adjusted dollars) median household income was $71,934 (with a margin of error of +/− $2,094) and the median family income was $83,924 (+/− $2,842). Males had a median income of $59,860 (+/− $2,733) versus $42,192 (+/− $2,081) for females. The per capita income for the township was $33,423 (+/− $926). About 4.5% of families and 5.7% of the population were below the poverty line, including 7.4% of those under age 18 and 4.6% of those age 65 or over.

2000 census
As of the 2000 United States census there were 89,706 people, 33,510 households, and 24,428 families residing in the township. The racial makeup of the township was 93.57% White, 1.75% African American, 0.13% Native American, 2.46% Asian, 0.02% Pacific Islander, 0.95% from other races, and 1.12% from two or more races. Hispanic or Latino of any race were 4.54% of the population.

There were 33,510 households, out of which 31.2% had children under the age of 18 living with them, 59.1% were married couples living together, 10.5% had a female householder with no husband present, and 27.1% were non-families. 22.7% of all households were made up of individuals, and 11.0% had someone living alone who was 65 years of age or older.  The average household size was 2.62 and the average family size was 3.09.

In the township the population was spread out, with 23.3% under the age of 18, 7.2% from 18 to 24, 27.2% from 25 to 44, 25.1% from 45 to 64, and 17.2% who were 65 years of age or older. The median age was 40 years. For every 100 females, there were 92.7 males.  For every 100 females age 18 and over, there were 89.1 males.

The median income for a household in the township was $54,776, and the median income for a family was $62,561. Males had a median income of $47,390 versus $30,834 for females. The per capita income for the township was $25,010.  About 4.0% of families and 5.7% of the population were below the poverty line, including 6.7% of those under age 18 and 6.1% of those age 65 or over.

Economy
Toms River has many shopping malls including Ocean County Mall (the only enclosed mall in Ocean County) and Seacourt Pavilion, located across Bay Avenue from the Ocean County Mall. It is home to the corporate headquarters of EGM Green, as well as the headquarters for OceanFirst Bank.

Arts and culture
The RWJBarnabas Health Arena (formerly Pine Belt Arena), a 3,500-seat public arena connected to Toms River High School North, is used for concerts, sporting events, and some small local events throughout the year to raise money for the school district. Starting in January 2018, the name was officially changed to the "RWJBarnabas Health Arena" after the district signed a five-year deal with RWJBarnabas Health under which the district will be paid a total of $637,500 for the naming rights.

Toms River Fest has been held during the summer in Toms River, bringing many people from in and out of the area, with 25,000 attendees at the 2008 event.

Joshua Huddy Park is located in Downtown Toms River and is host to a replica constructed in 1931 of the Revolutionary War fort that was once standing near the site. The town played host to a short skirmish during the Revolution in which Captain Joshua Huddy was captured by a group of Loyalists while defending the Toms River Blockhouse and hanged without trial. The trail of Captain Huddy can be followed throughout the town.

Media
The Asbury Park Press provides daily news coverage of Toms River Township, as does WOBM-FM radio. The government of the town provides columns and commentary to The Toms River Times, which is one of seven weekly papers from Micromedia Publications.

Sports
The John Bennett Indoor Athletic Complex is one out of three indoor athletic complex's in Ocean County and one of the largest in New Jersey. It was severely damaged as a result of Hurricane Sandy, reopening in January 2013 after repairs were completed.

Government

Local government 
Since 2002, Toms River Township has operated within the Faulkner Act (formally known as the Optional Municipal Charter Law) under the Mayor-Council form of New Jersey municipal government. The township is one of 71 municipalities (of the 564) statewide that use this form of government. The governing body is comprised of the Mayor and seven-member Township Council. The council includes four members who each represent one of four wards of the township and three who are chosen at-large. The mayor and the seven council members are chosen on a partisan basis as part of the November general election in odd-numbered years to serve four-year terms of office on a staggered basis, with the mayor and three at-large seats elected together and the four ward seats chosen simultaneously two years later.

, the Mayor of Toms River is Republican Maurice "Mo" B. Hill Jr., whose term of office expires December 31, 2023. Township Council members are Council President Kevin Geoghegan (R, 2023; at large), Council Vice President Matthew Lotano (R, 2023; at large), David Ciccozzi (R, 2025; Ward 4), Josh Kopp (R, 2023; at large), Justin Lamb (R, 2025; Ward 1), James Quinlisk (R, 2025; Ward 3) and Daniel T. Rodrick (R, 2025; Ward 2).

In February 2016, Kevin Geoghegan was appointed to fill the vacant Ward 2 seat expiring in 2017 of Brian Kubiel, who won election to an at-large seat in the November 2015 general election; Geoghegan served on an interim basis until the November 2016 general election, when voters chose Geoghegan to serve the balance of the term of office.

In December 2017, the Township Council appointed Don Guardian, the former Mayor of Atlantic City to replace Paul J. Shives; Guardian will be paid an annual salary of $175,000, while Shives had been paid $223,000.

Federal, state, and county representation 
Toms River is located in the 4th Congressional District and is part of New Jersey's 10th state legislative district.

 

Ocean County is governed by a Board of County Commissioners comprised of five members who are elected on an at-large basis in partisan elections and serving staggered three-year terms of office, with either one or two seats coming up for election each year as part of the November general election. At an annual reorganization held in the beginning of January, the board chooses a Director and a Deputy Director from among its members. , Ocean County's Commissioners (with party affiliation, term-end year and residence) are:

Commissioner Director John P. Kelly (R, 2022, Eagleswood Township),
Commissioner Deputy Director Virginia E. Haines (R, 2022, Toms River),
Barbara Jo Crea (R, 2024, Little Egg Harbor Township)
Gary Quinn (R, 2024, Lacey Township) and
Joseph H. Vicari (R, 2023, Toms River). Constitutional officers elected on a countywide basis are 
County Clerk Scott M. Colabella (R, 2025, Barnegat Light),
Sheriff Michael G. Mastronardy (R, 2022; Toms River) and
Surrogate Jeffrey Moran (R, 2023, Beachwood).

Politics
As of March 2011, there were a total of 59,987 registered voters in Toms River Township, of which 11,617 (19.4%) were registered as Democrats, 15,749 (26.3%) were registered as Republicans and 32,592 (54.3%) were registered as Unaffiliated. There were 29 voters registered to other parties. Among the township's 2010 Census population, 65.7% (vs. 63.2% in Ocean County) were registered to vote, including 83.6% of those ages 18 and over (vs. 82.6% countywide).

In the 2016 presidential election, Republican Donald Trump received 64.7% of the vote (28,545 cast), ahead of Democrat Hillary Clinton with 32.4% (14,287 votes), and other candidates with 3.0% (1,315 votes), among the 44,147 ballots cast by the township's voters. In the 2012 presidential election, Republican Mitt Romney received 57.0% of the vote (22,773 cast), ahead of Democrat Barack Obama with 42.0% (16,776 votes), and other candidates with 1.0% (408 votes), among the 40,235 ballots cast by the township's 62,614 registered voters (278 ballots were spoiled), for a turnout of 64.3%. In the 2008 presidential election, Republican John McCain received 57.2% of the vote (25,881 cast), ahead of Democrat Barack Obama with 40.8% (18,439 votes) and other candidates with 1.3% (600 votes), among the 45,215 ballots cast by the township's 62,909 registered voters, for a turnout of 71.9%. In the 2004 presidential election, Republican George W. Bush received 60.7% of the vote (26,203 ballots cast), outpolling Democrat John Kerry with 38.1% (16,467 votes) and other candidates with 0.6% (360 votes), among the 43,170 ballots cast by the township's 59,544 registered voters, for a turnout percentage of 72.5.

In the 2017 gubernatorial election, Republican Kim Guadagno received 62.3% of the vote (15,744 cast), ahead of Democrat Phil Murphy with 35.3% (8,929 votes), and other candidates with 2.3% (593 votes), among the 25,266 ballots cast by the township's voters. In the 2013 gubernatorial election, Republican Chris Christie received 74.5% of the vote (19,317 cast), ahead of Democrat Barbara Buono with 24.2% (6,269 votes), and other candidates with 1.3% (330 votes), among the 26,470 ballots cast by the township's 61,593 registered voters (554 ballots were spoiled), for a turnout of 43.0%. In the 2009 gubernatorial election, Republican Chris Christie received 66.8% of the votes (19,906 ballots cast), ahead of Democrat Jon Corzine with 26.7% (7,948 votes), Independent Chris Daggett with 4.6% (1,372 votes) and other candidates with 1.0% (283 votes), among the 29,782 ballots cast by the township's 61,578 registered voters, yielding a 48.4% turnout.

Education 
Students in pre-kindergarten through twelfth grade attend the Toms River Regional Schools, a regional public school system (centered primarily in Toms River Township) that is the largest suburban school district in New Jersey. In addition to students from Toms River, the district also serves the adjoining boroughs of Beachwood, Pine Beach and South Toms River. It is the largest suburban school district in the state, and the fourth largest school district in New Jersey (after Newark, Jersey City and Paterson). It is also the largest school district in the state that is not an Abbott District. As of the 2018–19 school year, the district, comprised of 18 schools, had an enrollment of 15,472 students and 1,171.6 classroom teachers (on an FTE basis), for a student–teacher ratio of 13.2:1. Schools in the district (with 2018–19 enrollment data from the National Center for Education Statistics) are 
Beachwood Elementary School (with 480 students; in grades K–5), 
Cedar Grove Elementary School (889; Pre-K–5), 
Joseph A. Citta Elementary School (569; K–5), 
East Dover Elementary School (702; Pre-K–5), 
Hooper Avenue Elementary School (720; K–5), 
North Dover Elementary School (519; K–5), 
Pine Beach Elementary School (435; K–5), 
Silver Bay Elementary School (637; Pre-K–5), 
South Toms River Elementary School (320; K–5), 
Walnut Street Elementary School (757; K–5), 
Washington Street Elementary School (369; K–5), 
West Dover Elementary School (383; K–5), 
Toms River Intermediate East (1,420; 6–8), 
Toms River Intermediate North (1,191; 6–8), 
Toms River Intermediate South (1,113; 6–8), 
Toms River High School East (1,416; 9–12), 
Toms River High School North (2,052; 9–12) and 
Toms River High School South (1,402; 9–12). Seats on the district's nine-member board of education are allocated based on the population of the constituent municipalities, with six seats assigned to Toms River.

Donovan Catholic High School, Ocean County's only Catholic high school, operates under the auspices of the Roman Catholic Diocese of Trenton. The diocese also operates St. Joseph's Grade School for students in Kindergarten through 8th grade.

Ocean County College, a two-year college that offers four-year options in cooperation with other New Jersey colleges and universities, is located on Hooper Avenue in Toms River. In May 2014, The Jay and Linda Grunin Foundation announced a $5.7 million donation to establish The Jay and Linda Grunin Center for the Arts, the largest single donation received in OCC's 50-year history.

Infrastructure

Transportation

Roads and highways

Toms River is crisscrossed by several major roadways, including the Garden State Parkway and U.S. Route 9, as well as Route 35, Route 37, Route 70, Route 166, County Route 527, County Route 530, County Route 549, County Route 571.

Two of the most congested roads are Hooper Avenue and Route 37, which sees extra traffic from travelers to the Jersey shore during the summertime, due to it being a main artery to the shore from the Garden State Parkway at interchange 82. The township is also home to one of the state's only at-grade cloverleafs, at the intersection of Hooper Avenue and County Route 571 (Bay Avenue).

This project was killed in 1980.

Public transportation
The major bus station in Toms River is located downtown, off exit 81 of the Garden State Parkway. The township is served by NJ Transit bus routes 67 (to Newark and Journal Square), 137 (to the Port Authority Bus Terminal (PABT) in Midtown Manhattan), 319 (PABT in New York City and the Atlantic City Bus Terminal), and 559 (to the Atlantic City Bus Terminal). Bus service to the Financial District in Lower Manhattan is also made available via the Academy Bus Line. Toms River Park & Ride is located in the township off of the Garden State Parkway at exit 81. It is an express route to New York City during peak rush-hour.

Ocean Ride local service is provided on the OC1 Whiting, OC1A Whiting Express, OC2 Manchester, OC3 Brick – Lakewood – Toms River, OC3A Brick – Point Pleasant and the OC10 Toms River Connection routes.

There are a number of taxi services around and within Toms River. Fares vary depending on the service.

The Central Railroad of New Jersey and Pennsylvania Railroad ended service to the township in the late 1940s. The nearest rail station is the terminus of the North Jersey Coast Line in Bay Head. Service is currently being evaluated to nearby Lakehurst on the proposed Monmouth Ocean Middlesex Line.

Health care
 Community Medical Center, with 587 beds, had been the state's largest non-teaching hospital. Community Medical Center became a teaching hospital in 2021, after being approved by the Accreditation Council for Graduate Medical Education and beginning with a group of 27 residents.

Community

 Toms River has been featured in television, including MTV which filmed three episodes of the show Made and scenes from MTV's Jersey Shore there.
 The toxic dumping that occurred in Toms River in 2001 was the subject of the 2013, Pulitzer Prize winning book Toms River: A Story of Science and Salvation by Dan Fagin.
 Toms River is home to many beaches located along the Jersey Shore, including Ortley Beach, Normandy Beach, Monterey Beach, Ocean Beach, Chadwick Beach and Silver Beach.
 The New Jersey Chili and Salsa Cook-Off, as well as the New Jersey Ice Cream Festival are held in Toms River.
 The Toms River Branch of Ocean County Library is the headquarters of the Ocean County Library system and the largest public library in Ocean County. In January 2006, a renovation project was completed that doubled the size of the facility.
 Toms River is home to Artisan's Brewery.
 The 1979 movie The Amityville Horror was filmed in Toms River, rather than Amityville on Long Island. Local police and ambulance workers played extras. The Toms River Volunteer Fire Company Number One was used to provide the "rain" during one of the exterior scenes. If you look closely, you can see that it is sunny and not "raining" in the background, the next street over.
 Downtown Toms River hosts many community events, including festivals such as Toms River Pride and the second largest Halloween parade in the world. The official logo is a 'T' with a river, forming an 'R', through it. The slogan is "Great Places. Familiar Faces."
 Toms River gained some notoriety in 1984 when local businessman Robert O. Marshall was charged with (and later convicted of) the contract killing of his wife, Maria. The case attracted the attention of true crime author Joe McGinniss, whose bestselling book on the Marshall case, Blind Faith, was published in 1989 and adapted into an Emmy-nominated 1990 television miniseries starring Robert Urich and Joanna Kerns.
 Several surrounding municipalities are served by Toms River mailing addresses, including South Toms River, parts of Manchester Township and parts of Berkeley Township.

Notable people

People who were born in, residents of, or otherwise closely associated with Toms River include:
 Platt Adams (1885–1961), athlete who won a gold medal in the standing high jump and a silver medal in the standing long jump at the 1912 Summer Olympics in Stockholm
 Corey Albano (born 1975), former professional basketball player
 Casey Bahr (born 1948), soccer defender who played one season in the North American Soccer League and Major Indoor Soccer League, and was a member of the U.S. soccer team at the 1972 Summer Olympics
 Darian Barnes (born 1980), former NFL fullback
 Alex Blackwell (born 1970), former NBA forward for the Los Angeles Lakers
 Rachel Bolan (born 1966), bass guitar player and main songwriter of the metal band Skid Row
 Tom Brown Jr. (born 1950), naturalist, tracker, survivalist and author
 Mike Bucci (born 1972), semi-retired professional wrestler best known for his appearances in Extreme Championship Wrestling as Nova, Super Nova, and "Hollywood" Nova and in World Wrestling Entertainment as Simon Dean
 Andrew Campbell (born 1984), yachtsman who represented the United States in Laser sailing competition at the 2008 Summer Olympics
 Sean Cashman (born 1987), baseball coach in the Texas Rangers organization who was head coach of the Saint Peter's Peacocks during the 2013 season
 Michael Chack (born 1971), former competitive figure skater who finished third at the U.S. Figure Skating Championships in 1993
 Syma Chowdhry, television news reporter in Philadelphia at KYW-TV
 Danny Clinch (born 1964), photographer
 Chris Connor (1927–2009), jazz singer
 Christopher J. Connors (born 1956), member of the New Jersey Senate since 2008, where he represents the 9th Legislative District
 John Cudia (born 1970), Broadway actor and singer
 Marguerite de Angeli (1889–1987), writer and illustrator of children's books including the 1950 Newbery Award winning book The Door in the Wall
 Jerry Dipoto (born 1968), former professional baseball player and an executive who is the general manager of the Seattle Mariners
 Ryan Doherty (born 1984), professional beach volleyball player who had been the first seven-foot-tall player in Minor League Baseball history
 Howard Dvorkin (born 1965), chairman of debt.com, author and businessman
 Frankie Edgar (born 1981), former UFC Lightweight Champion
 Lew Elverson (1912–1997), college football player and coach, track and field coach, and college athletics administrator.
 Jazmyn Foberg (born 2000), artistic gymnast who was the 2014 US Junior National All-Around and Uneven Bars Champion
 Marlene Lynch Ford (born 1954), politician, prosecutor and jurist who served in the New Jersey General Assembly
 Jeff Frazier (born 1982), former professional baseball player for the Detroit Tigers and Chicago Cubs, brother of Todd Frazier
 Todd Frazier (born 1986), professional baseball player for the New York Mets, 34th overall draft pick in the 2007 Major League Baseball Draft, brother of Jeff Frazier, Olympic silver medalist
 Julio M. Fuentes (born 1946), Senior United States circuit judge of the United States Court of Appeals for the Third Circuit, who is the first Hispanic judge to serve the Third Circuit
 Mia Galeotalanza, contestant on Survivor: Vanuatu
 Brian Geraghty (born 1974), actor, We Are Marshall (2006), The Guardian (2006), Bobby (2006) Jarhead (2005) and Chicago P.D. (2014)
 Jared Gertner, stage actor who played a co-starring role in the first touring and London productions of The Book of Mormon
 Frank Giannetti (born 1968), defensive tackle who played in the NFL who played for the Indianapolis Colts
 Ted Gillen (born 1968), former professional soccer player
 Erin Gleason (born 1977), short track speed skater who competed in three events at the 1998 Winter Olympics
 Melissa Gorga (born 1979), reality television personality, author, singer, designer and businesswoman, who joined the cast of The Real Housewives of New Jersey in its third season
 Alf Goullet (1891–1995), Australian-born cyclist who won more than 400 races on three continents, including 15 six-day races
 Bob Grant (1929–2013), radio host
 Sheree Gray (born 1985), soccer defender who represents Sky Blue FC of Women's Professional Soccer
 Lori Grifa, attorney who served as Commissioner of the New Jersey Department of Community Affairs from 2010 to 2012
 Tom Guiry (born 1981), actor who is best known for his lead performance in the cult coming-of-age film The Sandlot
 Virginia E. Haines (born 1946), politician who serves on the Ocean County Board of chosen freeholders and had served in the New Jersey General Assembly from 1992 to 1994 and as Executive Director of the New Jersey Lottery from 1994 to 2002
 Brian Hanlon, master sculptor and founder of Hanlon Sculpture Studio, specializing in bronze sculptures
 Judith Hird, ordained as the pastor of the Holy Cross Lutheran Church in Toms River in 1972, making her the first woman pastor of a Lutheran church
 James W. Holzapfel (born 1944), member of the New Jersey State Senate from the 10th Legislative District
 Anthony W. Ivins (1852–1934), an apostle of the Church of Jesus Christ of Latter-day Saints (LDS Church) and a member of the church's First Presidency from 1921 until his death
 Jeff Janiak (born 1976), vocalist of the punk rock band Discharge
 Marty Jannetty (born 1962), professional wrestler, best known as one-half of The Rockers in the World Wrestling Federation
 Gary Jobson (born , class of 1969), sailor, television commentator and author who is Editor at Large of Sailing World and Cruising World magazines and President of the National Sailing Hall of Fame
 Pavle Jovanovic (born 1977), Olympic bobsled competitor
 Chris Konopka (born 1985), MLS player for the Philadelphia Union
 Stephenie LaGrossa (born 1979), contestant on Survivor: Palau, Survivor: Guatemala and Survivor: Heroes vs. Villains, under the Heroes tribe
 Al Leiter (born 1965), former Major League Baseball player who pitched for both the New York Mets and New York Yankees
 Mark Leiter (born 1963), former Major League Baseball player
 Mark Leiter Jr. (born 1991), pitcher for the Philadelphia Phillies
 Shulem Lemmer (born 1990), singer and entertainer
 Leonard Lomell (1919–2011), U.S. Army Ranger who destroyed German gun emplacements on D-Day
 Tom MacArthur (born 1960), businessman and politician who was the member of the United States House of Representatives for New Jersey's 3rd congressional district from 2015 to 2019
 Gia Maione (1941–2013), singer and wife of singer Louis Prima
 Ron Marinaccio (born 1995), professional baseball pitcher for the New York Yankees
 Robert O. Marshall (1939–2015), businessman whose 1980s conviction for the contract murder of his wife was the subject of a controversial 1989 book and 1990 television miniseries
 Demetri Martin (born 1973), comedian, featured on The Daily Show and Comedy Central Presents
 Thomas A. Mathis (1869–1958), politician who served in the New Jersey Senate and was the Secretary of State of New Jersey from 1931 to 1941
 W. Steelman Mathis (1898–1981), politician who served in the New Jersey Senate from 1941 to 1942 and 1947 to 1966.
 Gregory P. McGuckin (born 1961), politician and former Toms River council member who has served in the New Jersey General Assembly, representing the 10th Legislative District since 2012
 Robert and Michael Meeropol (born 1947 and 1943, respectively), sons of convicted spies Julius and Ethel Rosenberg
 Tony Meola (born 1969), former soccer goalkeeper who represented the United States men's national soccer team at the 1990, 1994, and 2002 World Cups, and from 1996 to 2006 played in Major League Soccer
 Andy Messersmith (born 1945), former MLB pitcher who played for the California Angels (1968–1972), Los Angeles Dodgers (1973–1975 and 1979), Atlanta Braves (1976–1977) and the New York Yankees (1978)
 Kurt Metzger (born 1977), stand-up comedian, actor as well as a writer, producer and occasional actor on Inside Amy Schumer
 Joe Michelini (born 1988) musician, singer, songwriter and frontman for the indie/folk rock band River City Extension
 Jane Moffet (1930–2018), former utility player who played from 1949 through 1952 in the All-American Girls Professional Baseball League
 Steve Mormando (born 1955), fencer who competed in the individual and team sabre events at the 1984, 1988 and 1992 Summer Olympics
 Rocco Neri (1919–2011), politician who represented the 28th Legislative District in the New Jersey General Assembly from 1974 to 1976
 Beth Simone Noveck (born 1971), New Jersey's first Chief Innovation Officer
 Sergey Padyukov (1922–1993), architect, engineer, sculptor and human rights activist, best known for his work designing churches and other houses of worship
 Scott Palguta (born 1982), head men's soccer coach at Colorado College who played for the Colorado Rapids of Major League Soccer
 Piper Perabo (born 1976), stage, film, and television actress who has her breakthrough role in the 2000 film Coyote Ugly
 Ruth Polsky (1954–1986), pioneering booker and music promoter
 Sam Porcello (–2012), food scientist who developed the Oreo cookie's creme filling
 Maria Ressa, Filipino-American journalist and author who is best known for co-founding Rappler as its chief executive officer
 Charles E. Rosendahl (1892–1977), Admiral in the United States Navy, who was commanding officer of Lakehurst Naval Air Station
 John F. Russo (1933–2017), former politician who served in the New Jersey Senate and was Senate President
 Norton A. Schwartz (born 1951), retired United States Air Force general who served as the 19th Chief of Staff of the Air Force from 2008 until his retirement in 2012
 Joe Scott (born 1965), former men's head basketball coach for the United States Air Force Academy and Princeton University; current head coach at University of Denver
 Jason Snelling (born 1983), NFL running back for the Atlanta Falcons
 Cheryl Spector (1958–2007), gay, lesbian, bisexual and transgender activist
 William N. Stape (born 1968), screenwriter and magazine writer who wrote episodes of Star Trek: The Next Generation and Star Trek: Deep Space Nine
 Keith Stokes (born 1978), professional Canadian and American football wide receiver
 Noël Valis (born 1945), writer, scholar and translator who is a Professor of Spanish at Yale University
 Albert W. Van Duzer (1917–1999), bishop of the Episcopal Diocese of New Jersey, serving from 1973 to 1982
 Nick Werkman, former basketball player for the Seton Hall Pirates who set the team record for career points with 2,273

See also

 Toms River CDP, New Jersey
 Dover Beaches North, New Jersey
 Dover Beaches South, New Jersey

References

External links

 Toms River Township web site
Toms River Online
TomsRiver.org – Community News, Business Directory and Events Portal
The Toms River Times

 
1768 establishments in New Jersey
County seats in New Jersey
Faulkner Act (mayor–council)
Jersey Shore communities in Ocean County
Populated places established in 1768
Superfund sites in New Jersey
Townships in Ocean County, New Jersey